Star TV (standing for Satellite Television Asian Region), is an Asian TV service owned by Disney Networks Group Asia Pacific.

In 2008, author Shiau Hong-chi wrote that Murdoch's purchase of Star TV in 1993 was based on a theory of media globalization assuming that people across nations and languages will watch the same TV programs.  Shiau says that the original plan for Star TV was to broadcast popular American shows to Asian audience with as little effort as possible. However, the plan was unsuccessful and Star TV had to invest on local branches to make local shows.

On December 14, 2017, The Walt Disney Company announced their intent to acquire Star TV's parent company 21st Century Fox for  billion after the spin-off of certain businesses. On March 20, 2019, the deal was officially consummated.

Channels

Current
See Star India - Owned Channels

Former

See also
 Disney Networks Group Asia Pacific
 Fox Networks Group
 Disney Star
 Star Studios
 Hotstar
 Star (Disney+)
 Star+

References

External links

Television networks
Disney Star
Television channels and stations established in 1990